C. Ranganathan is an Indian film director and screenwriter who has worked on Tamil films. He made his debut with the 1996 romantic drama film, Coimbatore Mappillai starring Vijay and Sanghavi.

Career
Ranganathan is a distant relative of director R. Sundarrajan worked as an assistant director under him and S. A. Chandrasekhar. He initially began his career as actor portraying lead role in Oyilattam (1991) directed by Sundarrajan. He then became a director and made three consecutive successful Tamil films between 1996 and 1997 with the Vijay-starrer Coimbatore Mappillai, Tata Birla and Aahaa Enna Porutham all ending up as profitable ventures. By late 1997, he had started work on a new film titled Indru Mudhal Happy featuring Jayaram, Goundamani and Senthil in leading roles. By April 1998, the cast of the film was changed to include Pandiarajan and Preetha, though the film did not complete production.

He then launched another project titled Saamy Koduththa Varam in August 1998, with Napolean, Vignesh and Preetha starring. Despite a grand launch event, the film did not finish production. Similarly the film, Love Pannunga Sir featuring Livingston and Preetha, did not progress despite being announced in mid-1998. In 2001, he began another project titled Vandharu Jeicharu with television actor Akash and Uma. However, despite beginning production, the film also failed to finish.

As offers to make films began to get difficult, Ranganathan moved on to make television serials and notably worked with K. Bhagyaraj in the making of Vilakku Vacha Nerathula.

Filmography

Films

Director

Actor

Television

As actor

As director

References

Living people
Tamil film directors
Male actors in Tamil cinema
20th-century Indian film directors
Tamil-language film directors
1966 births